Neoparoecus is a genus of small flies of the family Lauxaniidae.

Species
N. gorodkovi (Shatalkin, 1992)
N. sapromyzina (Shatalkin, 1998)
N. signatipes (Loew, 1856)
N. simplicipes (Yarom, 1991)
N. tibialis (Yarom, 1991)

References

Lauxaniidae
Lauxanioidea genera